The 1924 Dartmouth Indians football team was an American football team that represented Dartmouth College as an independent during the 1924 college football season. In their second season under head coach Jesse Hawley, the Indians compiled a 7–0–1 record, shut out five of eight opponents, and outscored opponents by a total of 225 to 31.

Dartmouth's 1924 season was part of a 22-game unbeaten streak that began in November 1923 and continued until October 1926.

Henry Bjorkman was the team captain. Andy Oberlander was the team's leading scorer with 60 points scored on 10 touchdowns. R. B. Hall added 42 points on 7 touchdowns.

Schedule

References

Dartmouth
Dartmouth Big Green football seasons
College football undefeated seasons
Dartmouth Indians football